Fry Street may refer to:

Fry Street, Historic Fry Street area of Denton, Texas
Fry Street Fair
Fry Street Fire, Denton Texas
Fry Street, Chicago, venue of the Fry Street Quartet
Fry Street Pioneer Burial Ground in Grafton, New South Wales